John E. Aldred Estate, also known as St. Josaphat's Monastery, is a historic estate located at Lattingtown in Nassau County, New York.  It was designed in 1916 by architect Bertram Goodhue, with landscaping by Olmsted Brothers, for public utility executive John Edward Aldred.

The estate consists of the main residence, known as Ormston; the superintendent's quarters; hen house; -story, hip-roofed stable; greenhouse and conservatory; garage; utility shed; garden shed; gazebo; and two gatehouses.  The main house is a Tudor Revival–style dwelling built of random-coursed, quarry-faced limestone and roofed in heavy slate. The Basilian Order of Saint Josaphat purchased the property in 1944.

It was listed on the National Register of Historic Places in 1979.

References

External links

St. Josaphat's Monastery

Houses on the National Register of Historic Places in New York (state)
Tudor Revival architecture in New York (state)
Houses completed in 1916
Houses in Nassau County, New York
National Register of Historic Places in Oyster Bay (town), New York
Mansions of Gold Coast, Long Island